Lipovica is a Serbian toponym. It may refer to:

 Lipovica, Despotovac, a village in Serbia
 Lipovica, Lebane, a village in Serbia
 Lipovica, Leskovac, a village in Serbia
 Lipovica, Vlasotince, a village in Serbia
 Lipovica, Lipjan, a village in central Kosovo
 Lipovica, Leposavić, a locality in northern Kosovo
 Lipovica (peak in Kosovo), mountain peak in Kosovo

See also
Lipovice (Prachatice District), Czech Republic
Lipovička šuma, a forest near Belgrade, Serbia
Lipovice (disambiguation)
Lipovača (disambiguation)
Lipovci, Slovenia

Annotations